The 2021 French Road Cycling Cup was the 30th edition of the French Road Cycling Cup. 

The number of events was restored to 16 as many events returned to the calendar after having been cancelled in the 2020 edition due to the COVID-19 pandemic in France. The pandemic strongly impacted the schedule again, as four events have been rescheduled from spring to autumn.

Despite winning three races, the most of any rider in this edition of the cup, Elia Viviani finished second to Dorian Godon, who won two races and secured five other top-ten finishes. By virtue of winning the individual general classification, Godon also won the young rider classification.  completed the sweep by winning the teams classification, after having led it for all but one round; this was the team's third consecutive win in that classification.

Events 
The calendar featured the regular 16 events again, after last season when cancellations due to the COVID-19 pandemic reduced the cup to only eight races.

Final cup standings 
, after the Boucles de l'Aulne

Individual 
All competing riders were eligible for this classification.

Young rider classification 
All riders younger than 25 were eligible for this classification.

Teams 
Only French teams were eligible for this classification.

Notes

References

External links 
  

French Road Cycling Cup
French Road Cycling Cup
Road Cycling